Portrait of the Artist is a 2014 French drama film starring Bertrand Bonello.

Plot

Cast
Bertrand Bonello as Bertrand
Jeanne Balibar as Célia Bhy
Geraldine Pailhas as Célia Bhy
Joana Preiss as Barbara, dite Barbe
Pascal Greggory as Pascal
Nicolas Maury as Le jeune journaliste
Valerie Dreville as Alice
Marta Hoskins as Edwarda Kane
Barbet Schroeder as Le médecin
Charlotte Rampling as La mère (voice)
Isild Le Besco as Renée
Alex Descas as Scottie
Brady Corbet as Spectateur cinéma (uncredited)

References

External links
 
 

French drama films
2014 drama films
2010s French-language films
2010s French films